Barbara Conway may refer to:

Barbara Conway (journalist) (1952–1991).
Barbara Conway, character in Babes on Broadway
Barbara Conway, make-up artist, see 7th Irish Film & Television Awards